Dunlap is an unincorporated community in Grundy County, in the U.S. state of Missouri.

History
Variant names were "Banta", "Corneau", and "Dillon". A post office called Banta was established in 1881, the name was changed to Corneau in 1882, renamed again Dunlap in 1888, and the post office closed in 1942. The community most likely was named after William Dunlap, an early settler.

References

Unincorporated communities in Grundy County, Missouri
Unincorporated communities in Missouri